Kirill Stupak is a Belarusian chess grandmaster.

Chess career
He has represented his country in a number of chess olympiads, including 2010, 2012, 2014 and 2016.

He played in the Chess World Cup 2017, being defeated by Boris Gelfand in the first round.

References

External links 

Kirill Stupak chess games at 365Chess.com

1990 births
Living people
Chess grandmasters
Chess players from Minsk